Joko gegen Klaas – Das Duell um die Welt (English: Joko vs. Klaas – The Battle around the World) is a German reality series, broadcast on the German television network ProSieben on prime time.

It is a show that pins its two stars against one another in a series of challenges all over the globe. Hosts Joachim ‘Joko’ Winterscheidt and Klaas Heufer-Umlauf give each other a series of outrageous and tough challenges in countries all over the world; they know where they're going but have no idea what they will have to do until they get there. It is a travel game show and reality series where each host tries to push the other to their limits in an attempt to be crowned the "world champion" by taking on all the obstacles and coming out on top as the one who has won the battle for world domination.

Since the 6 season, the show were done in two teams (Team Joko and Team Klaas). Joko and Klaas sent several German celebrities from the other team to the challenges around the world. So both only did the challenge in the TV-studio.

Broadcasts

Joko vs. Klaas

Team Joko vs. Team Klaas

Links
https://www.prosieben.de/tv/das-duell-um-die-welt-joko-gegen-klaas

2012 German television series debuts
German-language television shows
ProSieben original programming